Endiyur is a village panchayat located in Tindivanam, in the Villupuram district of Tamil-Nadu, India. The pin code of Endiyur is 604 001 and the telephone STD code is 04147. The native language of the village is Tamil. The village is connected to nearby places through SH-134. The nearest railway station is Tindivanam which is 5 km from the village. Puducherry is 32.8 km from Endiyur. The village has a grand Draupadi Amman temple in the center of the village and the villagers celebrate 7 to 10 days of temple festival in the month of May or June (Tamil month: Panguni) every year including theemidhi thiruvizha (Fire Stamping).

Location 

Endiyur village is located in Tindivanam Taluk, Villupuram District of Tamil-Nadu State, India.

Latitude: 12.21 North

Longitude: 79.71 East

Pincode: 604 001

Endiyur is located in the Tindivanam-Marakkanam Road. It is 5 kilometers distant from Tindivanam taluk town and 25 kilometers distant from Marakkanam, the village panchayat town. The village is 116 kilometers from Chennai, the capital of Tamil Nadu. It is 32.8 kilometers from Puducherry, the union territory. Endiyur is surrounded by villages near by which includes Molasur, Katalai, Aathur, Guruvamapetai. Endiyur is a village panchayat and post office is located in the village. Village is administrated by Village Chairman who is elected through Panchayat Elections.

Streets in the Village 
Endiyur has the following areas or streets
 Road Street.
 Anna Statue Street.
 Bajanai Koil Street
 Pathaikarai Street
 Kulanthankarai Street
 Nethuntheuru Street
 Aachari Street
 Puthu Theru Street
 Pillayar Koil Street
 Mariyamman Koil Street

Population 
According to 2011 census, Endiyur has total population of 3103 of which 1556 are males and 1547 are females. Total of 773 families live in the village. Average Sex Ratio of Endiyur village is 994 which is lower than Tamil Nadu state average of 996. Endiyur village has lower literacy rate compared to Tamil Nadu. In 2011, literacy rate of Endiyur village was 74.85% compared to 80.09% of Tamil Nadu. In Endiyur, Male literacy rate stands at 85.92% while female literacy rate was 63.75%.

In Endiyur village, out of total population, 1536 are engaged in work activities. 77.21% of workers describe their work as Main Work (Employment or Earning more than 6 Months) while 22.79% are involved in Marginal activity providing livelihood for less than 6 months. Of 1536 workers engaged in Main Work, 526 are cultivators (owner or co-owner of lands) while 262 are Agricultural laborer.

Climate & Tourism

Climate 
Endiyur's climate is moderate, very similar to other parts of South India or Tamil Nadu. Summer is from April to August. Average temperature of summer is around 35 to 40 degree Celsius. Endiyur gets rainfall through North East Monsoon in the months of October, November and December. Average rainfall is around 15–20 cm in the monsoon season. The village does not get flooded with rainfall.

Tourism 
Some of the interesting tourist places near Endiyur are
 Vittalapuram Murugan Temple, Vittalapuram
 Perumukkal Hills
 Gingee Fort
 Melmaruvathur Adiparasakthi Temple
 Puducherry, Auroville beaches
 Sathanur Dam
 Thiruvannamalai Annamalaiyar Temple

Mode of Transport 

Endiyur is well connected through road transport from Tindivanam to Marakkanam through State Highway SH-134. Buses are available from Endiyur to Tindivanam and neighboring villages from 5 a.m. to 11 p.m. Share autos are also available from 7 a.m. to 8 or 9 p.m. Many of the inhabitants of Endiyur use personal bikes and cars as mode of transport.

Tindivanam is connected to Chennai, Puducherry and South Tamil Nadu through buses and trains.

The nearest railway station to the village is Tindivanam. South Indian Railway Trains from Chennai to south of Tamil Nadu such as Madurai, Trichy, Kanyakumari, Thoothukudi etc., pass through Tindivanam railway station. People can reach Tindivanam through trains or buses from Chennai, Puducherry or South Tamil Nadu. From Tindivanam they can reach Endiyur through buses or auto rickshaws.

Buses Connecting Endiyur 
Both public and private buses are available between Tindivanam to other villages in State Highways SH-134 which pass through Endiyur.

Public Buses 
Following are some buses operated by Tamil Nadu State Transport Corporation (TNSTC (VPM DIV I)) which pass through Endiyur.

Private Buses 
Following are the buses operated by private players:
 VMS Bus service
 Balaji Services
 TKP Motor services
 Manakula Vinayagar (NBC)
 RRS
 KVN
 MPR
 MRS
 Lakshmi Guruswamy

Schools & Colleges 
Literacy rate in Endiyur is 74.85% and many inhabitants of the village in this generation, go outside the village to do higher studies. Endiyur comes under Tindivanam education district.

Schools 
Endiyur educates the inhabitants and surrounding villagers with its own Government Higher Secondary School (GHSS). This school has class from 1st standard to 12th standard (HSC). Mode of education in the school is only Tamil. Mode of education through English is available at different private schools in Tindivanam nearby. Some of the renowned private schools at which students from Endiyur study are
 St Ann's Higher Secondary School, Tindivanam
 St Philomena's Higher Secondary School, Tindivanam
 St Joseph of Cluny Matriculation Higher Secondary School, Erayanur
 Tagore Senior Secondary School, Tindivanam
 Montfort Higher Secondary School, Tindivanam

Colleges 
Endiyur does not have any colleges. For higher education, students need to move away from the village. Arts college, Ayyanthoppu is available in nearby town Tindivanam. Many engineering colleges and polytechnic diploma colleges are available nearby around a distance of 50 kilometers in Maruvathur, Mailam, Puducherry to which students travel daily through school buses, buses or own vehicles.

University College of Engineering Tindivanam is one of the well renowned colleges in the area which is a constituent college of Anna University, Chennai for Engineering studies.

Other colleges near Endiyur are,
 Mailam Engineering College, Tindivanam
 Indira Gandhi Jayanthi Women's College, Tindivanam
 Thiru Govindasamy Government Arts College for Men, Tindivanam
 Dr. Rajabather Tagore Women Teachers Training College, Tindivanam
 PV polytechnic College, Tindivanam
 Saraswathy College of Engineering and Technology, Tindivanam
 Swamy Abedhanandha Polytechnic College-SAPTC, Vandavasi

Temples & Festivals

Temples 
List of temples in Endiyur are,
 Periyandavar Temple
 Draupadi Amman Temple
 Mariyamman Temple
 Kodhai Amman Temple
 Vinayagar Temple
 Kali Temple
 Rama Temple
 Anjeneyar Temple
 Ayyanar Temple
 Poovadakari Temple

Famous temples such as Vittalapuram Murugan temple, Maruvathur Adiparasakthi temple and Mailam Murugan temple are near to the village at a distance of less than 50 kilometers

Festivals 
Endiyur is very famous for its Draupadi Amman temple festival which is celebrated every year in the month of May or June i.e. in Tamil month Panguni. Draupadi Amman temple is located at the center of the village. During 7 to 10 days of festival in summer, separate events or chapters of Mahabharata are played daily in the form of Therukoothu (Draupadi Cult). Also, decorated god statues are taken around the village during every night in chariots. At the end of festival, Theemidhi Thiruvizha (fire stamping) is celebrated where people walk on fire which is spread in front of the temple holding some requests (Tamil: Prarthanai) to the Goddess Draupadi Amman.
Endiyur celebrates Pongal also, in a grand manner for 4 days in the month of January i.e. in Tamil month Thai (start of Thai). During Pongal festival season, for the month of whole Margazhi, people draw big rangolis in front of their houses (Tamil: Vasal). During Pongal days, they draw color rangolis, make Pongal dish in big pots (fire stove is made from ground) and feed cows with Pongal made. At the 3rd day of Pongal festival-maatu pongal evening, they collect all cows in the village at the center ground (Tamil: Mandhaveli), in front of the temple and do pooja for the cows.  Also inhabitants ride their vehicles such as tractor, bikes, cars, auto rickshaws etc., around the village for three rounds with all decorations in their vehicles. Colored Sticks (Tamil: Vanna Kol) with balloons are carried by children who are travelling in those vehicles. On 4th and final day of Pongal which is called Kari Naal, villagers travel to nearby temples or tourist places with the vehicles decorated. Jallikattu is not practiced in Endiyur.

Community, Occupation & Life Style

Community 
The inhabitants of the village are Hindus and they belong to Vanniyar (Vanniya Goundar) community. Few families of Acharya community and only one Muslim family live in the village. There is no population of Scheduled Caste (SC) and Scheduled Tribe (ST) in the village.

Occupation 
Many inhabitants of Endiyur are farmers. They own lands and they do farming on their own. They cultivate paddy, sugarcane, groundnuts, urad dhall, water melon, chilly, sesame seeds etc., The village has good water facilities through lake water irrigation (from chineri and periyeri) and well water irrigation systems. Fertilizer and pesticides are obtained from cooperative society and also from shops in Tindivanam. Agricultural equipment such as paddy planting machine, harvesting machines etc., are available with few farmers in the village who lend those equipment on rental basis to other farmers also. Tractors are available with many farmers in the village. Also, few farmers take tractors on rental basis from other farmers when they need them. Many inhabitants of the village from recent generation are well educated (mostly engineering studies) and they are working at companies located in Chennai or surroundings. Few of the inhabitants from the village are settled in other states of India or outside India also.

Life Style 
People speak Tamil and follow Tamil culture in Endiyur. Rice is the staple food of the village, like other Tamil Regions. Men wear shirt and dhoti as traditional dress and women wear saree as traditional dress. Endiyur has a marriage hall named Saraswathi Mahal. Marriages are conducted in marriage halls in the village or marriage halls in Tindivanam.

Some of the important family functions celebrated by families of Endiyur are,
 Kathani Vizha (Ear Pinching Function), which is done at the age of 2 to 4, in the temple of family God (Tamil: Kulathevaivam)
 Manjal Neeratu Vizha (Turmeric Bathing Ceremony) after puberty of a girl at the age of 12 to 16
 Parisam Podudhal (Engagement) before Marriage
 Kalyanam (Marriage)
 Valaikaapu (Fertility Function) done before first child birth at 7 to 8 months of pregnancy

Facilities at the Village 

Endiyur has two banks in its place i.e. Central Bank of India-Endiyur Branch and Co-operative Bank. Co-operative bank lends the farmers with agricultural loans, helping farmers to get fertilizers and pesticides at reduced rates etc., Endiyur does not have a big market place. Few shops are available where people can buy household items for urgency. A ration (fair price) shop is available in the village which provides rice, wheat, sugar, kerosene, salt etc., to people though public distribution system in fair and cheap price.  The village has some petrol bunks and also vehicle repair workshops. It also has 2 rice mills where people mill the paddy to get rice, grind masala; flour, break groundnut shell, extract oil etc., To buy vegetables and other required household items people travel to Tindivanam town. Tindivanam has a market place with textile and jewelry shops.

Central Bank of India-Endiyur 
The Central Bank of India maintains a branch office in Endiyur.

Drinking Water Facility 
Drinking water is distributed to all houses in the village through drinking water taps. A drinking water treatment plant is available at the village which was installed by Palmyra NGO in 2012. Taps are located at every 50 to 100 meters and one drinking water tap is shared between 3 and 5 families. Water is provided every morning from 7 to 9 a.m. People collect water in vessels and use them for whole day. Drinking water for the village is collected from selected drinking water wells from the village and it is stored in water tank located in the middle of the village. Houses in the village have their own wells or bore wells to use water for other purposes such as bathing and toilet.

Hospital Facility 
Endiyur has a government primary hospital. The hospital is open in the day times, from 10 a.m. to 5 p.m. Polio drops, Malaria Vaccine, Cholera Vaccine etc., are provided to inhabitants from the village hospital. Pregnant women in the village are checked regularly in the village hospital. For urgent treatments, people reach out to hospitals in Tindivanam. Tindivanam has a government hospital and also many private hospitals such as Senthil Clinic, Dr.Ramadoss Clinic etc.,

Other Facilities 
 Endiyur comes under Brahmadesam Police Station which is administrated by Police Sub-Inspector and it is located at a distance of 11 kilometers from Endiyur.
 Endiyur has a Sub Post Office which is coming under Tindivanam Head Post Office. Postal Code of Endiyur is 604001.
 Endiyur has a village administration office which is managed by a Village Administrative Officer (VAO) generally known as Maniyakar in Tamil. Birth certificate, death certificate, income proof, address proof, ration cards, land measurement proof etc., are obtained from the VAO. 
 Endiyur has a veterinary hospital where cows and other cattle from the village are treated by a veterinary doctor 
 Loan for agricultural equipment such as tractors are obtained from Land Development bank (LD Bank), Marakkanam.
 Endiyur has a cemetery grave yard outside the village where dead bodies of the villagers are burnt or buried

Politics & Administration 
Endiyur inhabitants follow different political parties such as PMK (Pattali Makkal Katchi), DMDK (Desiya Murpokku Dravida Kazhagam), ADMK (Anna Dharavida Munetra Kazhagam), DMK (Dharavida Munetra Kazhagam), BJP (Bharatiya Janatha Party). Endiyur is a village panchayat presidential constituency, along with Guruvamapettai. Adding Kattalai village along, Endiyur becomes Counselor constituency. Endiyur comes under Tindivanam State Assembly constituency and Villupuram Lok Sabha constituency. Statues of Annadurai (Anna), M.G.Ramachindran (MGR), Mahatma Gandhi are placed in the village.

The administration team of Endiyur includes,

Panchayat President: K.P.Munusamy from PMK

Counselor: R.S.K. Ramesh from PMK

MP: S.Rajendran from ADMK

District Collector: M.Lakshmi, IAS

Sub Collector, Tindivanam: Sridhar.N, IAS

NGOs & Groups

Palmyra 
Palmyra is a facilitating NGO located in Aurobrindavan, Auroville. It helps Endiyur with various projects such as canal construction from lakes to lands, toilet construction for houses in the village, formation of self-help groups, maintenance of lakes in the village for irrigation etc., Palmyra has finished a project of construction toilet and bathroom facilities in every house in the village in 2013 and around 250 people got sanitation facilities as a result of this project. Palmyra has also worked on drinking water treatment plant and installed a water treatment plant in the village in the year 2012.

Self Help Groups 
Women in Endiyur have formed self-help groups (Tamil: Mahalir Sangam) from the year 2000 and they run those groups continuously. These groups help women in the village with empowerment. They collect small savings every month and lend the same money as loan to the needy in the group itself. Also these self-help groups deposit their savings in bank and get interest for their savings. Government provides subsidies for the self-help groups to get loans for special occasions

Endiyur Boys Group 
Endiyur Boys (Tamil: எண்டியூர் பாய்ஸ்) Group has educated youngsters from Endiyur who are working towards improvement of their village by sharing knowledge with other fellow villagers.. Many members of the group are away from the village as they are working in Chennai, Mumbai and Bangalore. But still the group is active through online social networks such as whatsapp and Facebook. This group discusses on current affairs of their village and improvement steps to be taken through whatsapp group chats and Facebook

References

Villages in Viluppuram district